Bilur, also ambiguously known as Minigir, is an Oceanic language of the Papua New Guinea. It is not closely related to other languages, and its classification is uncertain.

References

Languages of East New Britain Province
St George linkage